Gajdoš (feminine Gajdošová) is a Slovak and Moravian surname meaning "piper". Notable people with the surname include:
 Jan Gajdoš, Czech gymnast
 Jarmila Gajdošová, Slovak-Australian tennis player
 Kazimír Gajdoš, Slovak footballer
 Miloslav Gajdoš, Czech double bass player
 Vratislav Gajdoš, Slovak footballer

Czech-language surnames
Slovak-language surnames